Bartlot is a surname. Notable people with the surname include:

Richard Bartlot (1471–1557), English physician
Barttelot baronets, sometimes written Bartlot